Unkei is a crater on Mercury. Its name was adopted by the International Astronomical Union in 1976, after the Japanese sculptor Unkei.

The peak-ring basin Chekhov is to the south of Unkei.

References

Impact craters on Mercury